Nicola Coldstream, FSA, (née Imogen Nicola Carr born June 1942) is a British architectural historian and academic with special interests in the 13th and 14th centuries. Coldstream studied History and Fine Arts at Cambridge University and obtained her PhD at the Courtauld Institute of Art.

Professional service and memberships 
Coldstream became a Fellow of the Society of Antiquaries of London (elected 11 November 1982) and in 1996 she became Deputy Editor of Grove Dictionary of Art. In recent years she has held the following positions: Vice-President (Current); Past President (2004–2007) British Archaeological Association; Chairman of the Corpus of Romanesque Sculpture in Britain and Ireland (2009–12); Trustee of Corpus of Romanesque Sculpture in Britain and Ireland (Current); Member of Church of England’s Cathedrals Fabric Commission (2016–2021) and Sculpture and Furnishings Conservation Committee.

Writing 
In The Decorated Style: Architecture and Ornament, 1240-1360 (1994), Coldstream highlights the effects on patron influence on architectural design and commissions.

Medieval Architecture (2002), an Oxford History of Art book about the medieval period of architecture was called by Contemporary Review a "beautifully written survey of a long period which does not flag." Medieval Architecture is organized by thematic style and emphasizes religious architecture. The Art Book writes that the book is beautifully illustrated and has "fascinating new perspectives on world art and architecture," however, the book may not be easy for beginners to navigate the terminology.

Coldstream contributed to the 2011 volume in honour of Paul Crossley, Image, Memory and Devotion: Liber Amicorum Paul Crossley (Studies in Gothic Art 2) edited by Zoë Opačić and Achim Timmermann. In her chapter, Coldstream provides "a new interpretation of the so-called Eleanor Crosses", arguing that "the twelve crosses may have been a calculated allusion to the twelve gates of the New Jerusalem in Revelation 21.12."

Selected works 
 Medieval Architecture (Oxford University Press, 2002) 
 The Decorated Style : Architecture and Ornament, 1240–1360 (University of Toronto Press, 1994) 
 Masons and Sculptors (University of Toronto Press, Scholarly Publishing Division, 1991) 
 Coldstream contributed an article on fellow medievalist and art historian Jean Bony to Women Medievalists and the Academy, 2005, edited by Jane Chance .

Personal life 
Coldstream has published written work and photographs as 'Imogen Coldstream' and 'Nicola Carr', and 'Imogen Coldstream' is the name registered with the Society of Antiquaries.

Coldstream was married to the British archaeologist Nicolas Coldstream, who was also a Fellow of the Society of Antiquaries.

Other information 
Photographs contributed by Nicola Coldstream to the Conway Library are currently being digitised by the Courtauld Institute of Art, as part of the Courtauld Connects project.

References 

British women historians
20th-century British women writers
Fellows of the Society of Antiquaries of London
1942 births
Living people
20th-century British historians
21st-century British historians
21st-century British women writers
British architectural historians